Zagalu may refer to:

Tsovak, Armenia, formerly Nizhniy Zagalu
Akhpradzor, Armenia, formerly Verkhniy Zagalu